Lionel Causse (born 6 May 1971) is a French politician of La République En Marche! (LREM) and Territories of Progress (TDP) who has been serving as a member of the French National Assembly since the 2017 elections, representing the department of Landes.

Political career
Causse holds a position in the Bureau of the National Assembly of the 15th legislature of the French Fifth Republic as a secretary, under the leadership of president Richard Ferrand. He also serves on the Committee on the Sustainable Development and Spatial Planning. In addition to his committee assignments, he is a member of the French-Burmese Parliamentary Friendship Group and the French-Laos Parliamentary Friendship Group.

In July 2019, Causse was one of nine LREM members who voted against his parliamentary group's majority and opposed the French ratification of the European Union’s Comprehensive Economic and Trade Agreement (CETA) with Canada.

See also
 2017 French legislative election

References

1971 births
Living people
People from Toulouse
Socialist Party (France) politicians
La République En Marche! politicians
Territories of Progress politicians
Deputies of the 15th National Assembly of the French Fifth Republic
Deputies of the 16th National Assembly of the French Fifth Republic
Mayors of places in Nouvelle-Aquitaine